Thomas's Oldfield mouse (Thomasomys pyrrhonotus) is a species of rodent in the family Cricetidae.

It is found in Ecuador and Peru.

References 

 Baillie, J. 1996.  Thomasomys pyrrhonotus.   2006 IUCN Red List of Threatened Species.   Downloaded on 20 July 2007.
Musser, G. G. and M. D. Carleton. 2005. Superfamily Muroidea. pp. 894–1531 in Mammal Species of the World a Taxonomic and Geographic Reference. D. E. Wilson and D. M. Reeder eds. Johns Hopkins University Press, Baltimore.

Thomasomys
Mammals described in 1886
Taxa named by Oldfield Thomas
Taxonomy articles created by Polbot